Luluk Hadiyanto (born 8 June 1979) is a badminton player from Indonesia, specialized in men's doubles and former world number one with doubles partner Alvent Yulianto.

Early years
"Lulu" as he is fondly called, was a member of badminton club PB Djarum. He was born in the small village of Pengkolrejo, in the district of Japah, Blora, Central Java. He was the first son of three siblings of the couple Edi Sunarto and Sulami, his parents both educators at an elementary school. His father encouraged both his sports career in Jakarta and his educational development in Solo. In 1999 he was finally accepted in the National Squad at the Pelatnas Cipayung.

Career
His first big international success came in 2001 winning the Thailand Open with Sigit Budiarto.
In partnership with fellow countryman Alvent Yulianto, Hadiyanto won four top tier international men's doubles titles in 2004; the Thailand, Korea, Singapore, and Indonesia Opens. They achieved a number one world ranking that year despite a disappointing 2004 Olympics which saw them eliminated in the round of 16. Since 2004 Hadiyanto and Yulianto have struggled to achieve top form. Second place finishes in the quadrennial Asian Games (2006); and the Japan (2007) and Korea (2008) Opens (now called Super Series events) have been their highest finishes in major international tournaments, though they won the Indonesian national title in 2007. In 2006 they also won a bronze medal at the Asian Badminton Championships in Johor Bahru, Malaysia.

After a disappointing 21-19, 14-21, 14-21, first round loss against the Japanese Keita Masuda &	Tadashi Ohtsuka at the 2008 Olympics with Alvent Yulianto, the couple split partnership and Luluk left the National team of Indonesia. From 2009 Luluk Hadiyanto as an independent then first partnered Candra Wijaya and then more frequently Joko Riyadi. Still in men's doubles Luluk Hadiyanto won his last big event, the 2009 Vietnam Open with new partner Joko Riyadi, seeded 7th beating 1st seeded Malaysian doubles pair Choong Tan Fook & Lee Wan Wah 21-17, 22-20 in the semi-finals and then another Malaysian couple Hoon Thien How & Ong Soon Hock in the final of this BWF Grand Prix event in straight games 21-19, 22-20. In 2010 Luluk Hadiyanto again formed a doubles combination with Candra Wijaya. In the middle of 2011 Luluk changed partnership one last time prior to retirement, he coupled up with fellow Indonesian Imam Sodikin Irawan.

Achievements

World Championships 
Men's doubles

Asian Games 
Men's doubles

Asian Championships 
Men's doubles

BWF Superseries (2 runners-up) 
The BWF Superseries, which was launched on 14 December 2006 and implemented in 2007, is a series of elite badminton tournaments, sanctioned by the Badminton World Federation (BWF). BWF Superseries levels are Superseries and Superseries Premier. A season of Superseries consists of twelve tournaments around the world that have been introduced since 2011. Successful players are invited to the Superseries Finals, which are held at the end of each year.

Men's doubles

IBF World Grand Prix (6 titles, 2 runners-up) 
The World Badminton Grand Prix sanctioned by International Badminton Federation (IBF) from 1983 to 2006.

Men's doubles

IBF International (1 runner-up) 
Men's doubles

Post-playing career
After his active career Luluk Hadiyanto earned his Bachelor of Science degree in the Department of Public Administration at the University of Indonesia, and is now working for the Indonesian Ministry of Youth and Sport (Kemenpora) in the field of badminton specifically teaching in diklat SKO Ragunan (Ragunan Sports School). The players of Ragunan Sports School who joined National Team include Yeremia Rambitan, Ikhsan Leonardo I. Rumbay, Amri Syahnawi. He earned a master's degree in Sport Management at his post graduate study at the Jakarta State University.

Personal life 
Luluk Hadiyanto is married to Wardahnia and the couple have 2 son and 1 daughter namely ; Rajendra Bhima Hadiyanto, Alesha Wardhani Hadiyanto and Ranedra Mirza Hadiyanto

References

External links

 PB Djarum Player's Profile

1979 births
Living people
People from Blora Regency
Sportspeople from Central Java
Indonesian male badminton players
Badminton players at the 2004 Summer Olympics
Badminton players at the 2008 Summer Olympics
Olympic badminton players of Indonesia
Badminton players at the 2006 Asian Games
Asian Games silver medalists for Indonesia
Asian Games bronze medalists for Indonesia
Asian Games medalists in badminton
Medalists at the 2006 Asian Games
Competitors at the 2003 Southeast Asian Games
Competitors at the 2005 Southeast Asian Games
Southeast Asian Games gold medalists for Indonesia
Southeast Asian Games silver medalists for Indonesia
Southeast Asian Games bronze medalists for Indonesia
Southeast Asian Games medalists in badminton
World No. 1 badminton players